The Aasiaat Museum is a museum in Aasiaat, Qeqertalik Municipality, Greenland.

History
The establishment of the museum started in late 1960s when there were some discussions on transforming the house of former whaling captain Frederik Lynge into a museum. In April 1977, the museum committee was formed. The museum was finally opened on 3 December 1978 at location B-404. In summer 1986, a museum curator was hired and the museum became eligible to receive funding from the Naalakkersuisut. In 2002, the museum moved to its current location at B-24. The building used to house the colony manager.

Exhibitions
The museum has a section of permanent exhibition as well as contemporary exhibitions. Exhibitions show historical artifacts from Greenland.

The exhibitions include:
 Inuit hunting tools
 Two umiaqs, one made with sealskin and the other with canvas
 A Greenlandic dog sled
 A sod house, which is a model of what Greenlandic homes looked like during the late 1800s and early 1900s
 Traditional costumes, showing men's and women's costumes

See also
 List of museums in Greenland

References

External links
 

1978 establishments in Greenland
Museums in Greenland
Qeqertalik
Museums established in 1978